The 20th Minesweeping Flotilla was a Royal Australian Navy minesweeping flotilla that operated during the Second World War. Formed on 9 December 1939 and styled in the naming convention for minesweeping flotilla names used by the Royal Navy, the flotilla consisted of HMAS Swan, Yarra, Doomba and Orara. The makeup of the flotilla changed during the course of the war.

Ships of the flotilla
HMAS Swan
HMAS Yarra
HMAS Doomba
HMAS Orara
HMAS Warrego
HMAS Warrnambool
HMAS Echuca
HMAS Burnie
HMAS Mildura
HMAS Bunbury
HMAS Katoomba
HMAS Lithgow
HMAS Ararat
HMAS Cowra
HMAS Dubbo
HMAS Rockhampton
HMAS Townsville
HMAS Deloraine

History of the Royal Australian Navy